Király is a Hungarian surname, meaning king (female Királyné/Királynő). The name is predominantly found in communities across Hungary, followed by Austria, Slovenia, and Switzerland in terms of frequency per million of citizens. Origins of the surname include the Slavonic word of the late 1600s meaning "king". It is also a middle high German word, used as a term of endearment, for curly headed individuals.

Pronunciation 
This pronunciation of Kiraly differs by region. The American pronunciation of Kiraly is "Keer-ah-lee." The accent falls on the first syllable. The Hungarian pronunciation is /kiraːj/, used by Gábor Király.

Kiralys in the United States 
Small pockets of Kiraly families exist around the world, primarily in Hungary, but most in the United States are found in Cleveland, Ohio, the state of Connecticut, and in Arlington, Virginia. And some are also in the far west region of Texas.

Notable people
Notable people with the name include:
Annamária Király (born 1985), Hungarian handball player
Béla Király (1912–2009), Hungarian general and politician
Botond Király (born 1994), Hungarian footballer
 Don Kiraly (born 1953), American linguist
Ede Király (1926–2009), Hungarian figure skater
Gábor Király (born 1976), Hungarian footballer
Hajnalka Kiraly (born 1971), Hungarian-born French épée fencer
 Karch Kiraly (born 1960), American volleyball player and coach
Linda Király (born 1983), American-Hungarian singer-songwriter
 Lucy Kiraly (born 1950), Australian fashion model and television presenter
Mónika Király (born 1983), Hungarian road cyclist
Pál Király (1880–1965), Hungarian engineer and weapons designer
Pál Király (athlete) (1896–1969), Hungarian long-distance runner
Viktor Király (born 1984), Hungarian–American pop singer
Zoltán Király (born 1948), Hungarian journalist, educator, and politician

See also
Szent István király, Saint Stephen
István király, Hungarian opera
István, a király, Hungarian rock opera
Király Baths, Hungarian thermal bath

Hungarian-language surnames